Hong Kong Sanatorium & Hospital, or HKSH, is a private hospital established in 1922 in Happy Valley, Hong Kong.

The hospital has more than 500 beds and various room types and facilities. It also has a 24 hours outpatient consultation service.

HKSH has a School of Nursing, affiliated with The Open University of Hong Kong, which trains nurses up to degree level. It is affiliated with the Li Ka Shing Faculty of Medicine of the University of Hong Kong and provides clinical attachment opportunities for HKU medical students. 

History 
The hospital was founded in 1922 (known then as The Yeung Wo Nursing Home) by a group of Chinese medical practitioners and residents of Hong Kong. The aim was to provide hospital facilities for the Chinese community, and to provide accessible accommodation for patients to be cared for by their own doctors.

A popular public amusement centre in Happy Valley, known as "The Happy Retreat", was acquired for the location of the hospital. The hospital opened its doors in September 1922 with 28 beds. Dr. Wai-Cheung Chau (1893–1965) served as its Superintendent, and Dr. Lee Sun Chau (1890–1979) served as the Matron of the hospital.

Four years after the opening, a landslip occurred on the hill slope behind the two buildings, causing considerable damage. The nursing home had to be closed for some six months in order that the premises could be made habitable for admission of patients .

Dr. Li Shu Fan, who had just returned to Hong Kong after serving as head of Kung Yee University Medical School in Canton, was chosen to lead the hospital in 1926. It was under his leadership that the name of the nursing home was changed to its present form, Hong Kong Sanatorium and Hospital.  Dr LI Wai Tat, Walton is now the current Medical Superintendent of HKSH, and Chief Executive Officer of HKSH Medical Group.

See also 

 List of hospitals in Hong Kong

References

External links 

 
 Wong & Ouyang (HK) Ltd., "More than half-a-century of architectural design experience in Hong Kong", section "Hong Kong Sanatorium & Hospital", p. 60, September 2009

Hospitals in Hong Kong
Articles containing Chinese-language text
Coordinates not on Wikidata